Robotech: Love Live Alive is an American direct-to-video  animated film produced by Harmony Gold USA released on July 23, 2013. It is based on the 1985 Japanese OVA music video Genesis Climber MOSPEADA: Love Live Alive by Tatsunoko Production but adapted to the continuity of the Robotech universe.

Plot 
In the year 2044, a news reporter named Kay interviews Lancer a few hours before his scheduled concert. Lancer recalls the events leading to the Third Robotech War, along with his prior involvement with the 10th Mars Division and his association with the band of rebels that helped defeat the Invid forces. After the interview, he starts his concert with a rendition of Lynn Minmei's "We Will Win".

Following the concert as Lancer sits alone at night and only thinks to himself, he is surprised by his returning family. Scott, Marlene/Ariel, Rand, Rook, Lunk, and Annie all take him out for a campfire dinner and talk about what the REF has been up to in the aftermath of Robotech: The Shadow Chronicles. Lancer denies an invitation from Scott and Rand to join them on the fleet's new mission to find Admiral Hunter and the SDF-3, giving his own valid reason as they all head off for some sleep. Lancer remains awake and leaves his family behind. He drives through the country while back at his small cabin, Sera prepares breakfast for her returning love. As he returns, Lancer and Sera reaffirm their devotion and Sera reveals to him that she is expecting their first child soon.

Cast
 Frank Catalano as Rand
 Cam Clarke as Lancer
 Richard Epcar as Lunk
 Barbara Goodson as Sera
 Alexandra Kenworthy as the Regess
 Steve Kramer as Dimitry
 Wendee Lee as Kay
 Suzy London as Rook
 Tony Oliver as Admiral Hunter
 J. Jay Smith as the Narrator
 Gregory Snegoff as Scott Bernard
 Tom Wyner as Jonathan Wolfe

Uncredited cast (flashbacks)
 Emilie Brown as Annie
 Bill Capizzi as General Reinhardt
 Melanie MacQueen as Ariel / Marlene
 Melissa Newman as Dana Sterling
 Michael Sorich as Sparks
 Paul St. Peter as Zor

Background 
First revealed in late 2011 in the final minutes of Carl Macek's Robotech Universe, a documentary on the making of Robotech dedicated to the then-recent passing of Macek, Robotech: Love Live Alive was planned as an adaptation of the 1985 Genesis Climber MOSPEADA OVA, Love Live Alive, incorporating some brand new animation. The film was initially released in the United States as part of a 2-movie collection with Robotech: The Shadow Chronicles on July 23, 2013 by Lionsgate Home Entertainment. It was released as a standalone DVD in Australia on August 1, 2013 by Beyond Home Entertainment. It was released in the U.K. on January 27, 2014 by Revelation Films.

References

External links
 

2013 anime OVAs
2013 films
Anime-influenced Western animation
Clip shows
Films set in 2044
Mecha anime and manga
Robotech
Tatsunoko Production
Lionsgate animated films
2010s English-language films
2010s American films